Bedell is a hamlet in Delaware County, New York, United States.

Notes

Hamlets in Delaware County, New York
Hamlets in New York (state)